Shesh Theke Shuru is a 2019 Indian Bengali language  action drama film directed by Raj Chakraborty while story, screenplay and dialogues were written by Aditya Sengupta. The film features Jeet, Koel Mallick and Ritabhari Chakraborty in the lead role. It was shot across London, Dhaka and Kolkata. The movie was adapted from the novel Water & Fire. This movie was 50th movie of Jeet since his first movie Chandu (2001).

Plot

A Dhaka-based businessman Mahid Sheikh falls for Pujarini, a charming research scholar from Kolkata but dark secrets from Mahid's past threaten to resurface and shatter their peaceful world.

Cast
 Jeet as Mahid Sheikh, a businessman from Dhaka 
 Koel Mallick as Pujarini, who lives in Kolkata
 Ritabhari Chakraborty as Farzana
 Joy Bhowmik (UK) as Huzeifa Chacha
 Tridha Choudhury as Yasmin
 Saptarshi Maulik
 Sayantika Banerjee as an item number "Madhubala"(cameo appearance)
Somnath Kar as Jewel
Saurav Chakraborty as Rakib
Krishno Kishore Mukhopadhyay as Pujarini's father
Anindita Bose as Pujarini's friend
Tulika Basu as Pujarini's mother(cameo)

Development

Production
The director Raj Chakraborty and the leading pair Jeet and Koel Mallick are collaborating after 4 years since they last worked altogether in 2015 film Besh Korechi Prem Korechi.

Soundtrack

References

External links
 

2019 films
Indian action drama films
Bengali-language Indian films
2010s Bengali-language films
Films shot in London
Bengali remakes of Telugu films
2019 action drama films
Films directed by Raj Chakraborty